The women's 100 metre backstroke event at the 2014 Commonwealth Games as part of the swimming programme took place on 25 and 26 July at the Tollcross International Swimming Centre in Glasgow, Scotland.

The medals were presented by Suzanne Weckend-Dill, Athlete Representative of the Commonwealth Games Federation and the quaichs were presented by James Hickman, Global Sports Marketing Manager of Speedo.

Records
Prior to this competition, the existing world and Commonwealth Games records were as follows.

The following records were established during the competition:

Results

Heats

Qualification swim-off

Semifinals

Final

References

External links

Women's 100 metre backstroke
Commonwealth Games
2014 in women's swimming